Allsang på Grensen (Sing-along at the Border) was a Norwegian musical entertainment programme that has been broadcast every summer on the TV 2 channel following its premiere in June 2007. The programme is based on the Swedish program Allsång på Skansen. The programme has always been hosted Katrine Moholt. The 2012 season was watched by 316,000 and the 2014 season by 336,000. The programme is recorded at Fredriksten Fortress, a 10,000-seat border fortress in Halden during the summer.

In January 2022, TV2 announced that the 16th season would be the last.

References 

2007 establishments in Norway
Norwegian music television series
TV 2 (Norway) original programming
Halden
2007 Norwegian television series debuts
2000s Norwegian television series
2010s Norwegian television series
2020s Norwegian television series
2022 Norwegian television series endings